The Cuajone mine is a large copper mine located in the south of Peru in Moquegua Region. Cuajone represents one of the largest copper reserve in Peru and in the world having estimated reserves of 1.6 billion tonnes of ore grading 0.57% copper.

The mine has resulted in an environmental conflict, because local residents say that the mine pollutes the environment without providing economic benefits. In February, 2022 local residents blockaded rail access to the mine and cut its water supply, demanding $5 billion in compensation and 5% of the mine's profits.

Geology
The porphyry copper deposit and hypogene mineralization occurred in the Early Eocene.  Supergene sulfide enrichment began in the Late Oligocene and continued until the Early Miocene.  Chalcocite is the more common copper ore mineral as massive assemblages.

See also
Toquepala mine
Quellaveco mine
Yanacocha
Cerro de Pasco
Huancavelica

 List of mines in Peru

 Zinc mining

References 

Copper mines in Peru
Environmental justice